James Woodward may refer to:

Academics
 James F. Woodward, American professor of physics and history
 James H. Woodward, aeronautical engineer, professor and chancellor of UNC Charlotte

Others
 James G. Woodward (1845–1923), American newspaperman and politician; mayor of Atlanta, Georgia
 James T. Woodward (1837–1910), American banker and owner of a major thoroughbred horse dynasty
 James Woodward (cricketer) (born 1963), English cricketer